Lake Mallalieu is located in St. Croix County, Wisconsin just inside of North Hudson, Wisconsin. The man-made lake is 289 acres with a maximum depth of 17 feet. It is a flowage lake almost on the Minnesota border connected to both the Willow River and the St. Croix River.

History 
To understand how the man-make lake originated, we must understand its source, the Willow River. The Willow River flows into Lake Mallalieu, and similar to the other rivers in the area, is a product of the continental glaciation. At the end of the Ice Age, a mile-thick massive ice sheet spread into Wisconsin until about 10,000 years ago when the warm climate forced it to retreat, creating the Willow River.

The Willow River, which would eventually run into Lake Mallalieu, carved channels around the lake and formed high banks surrounding. After its foundational period, the Willow settled into what we see today.  Vegetation stabilized the watershed, which reduced the erosion until the nineteenth century settlement.

Early years
The first settlers of Hudson, French-Canadians brothers-in-law Louis Massey and Peter Bouchea, found a place to call home at the mouth of the Willow in 1840. In 1848, the first dam and sawmill was built by James Purrington, which created a lake called Willow Pond. Settlement became more popular because of the steamboat and practical transportation provided by the nearby St. Croix River. In 1854, Caleb Greene built the second dam, known as “brush dam.” The dams were bought by D.A. Baldwin of the West Wisconsin Railroad in 1867 and then again by Comstock and Clark who made further improvements.

In 1867, Henry and William Montman built a brewery on the south shore of the Willow Pond. The brewery now would be located where the public boat launch is, and used the caves for aging the beer. After multiple owners, the brewery burned down in 1917, but was never rebuilt due to the prohibition.

In 1871, the railroad arrival made a drastic change for Hudson. The railroad was located on the cliffs hanging about the lake, and with the railroad and the rivers, it was an important spot for transportation and settlement.

Middle Years 
In 1887, Willow Pond became what we know as Lake Mallalieu. During this time, Dr. Irving Wiltrout was building Hudson’s first hospital and in honor of him, the Hudson Star & Times wanted to name the lake “Lake Irving,” which the doctor declined and said, “I have named this lake in honor of Rev. William F. Mallalieu, D.D., L.L.D., Bishop of the Methodist church and a resident of New Orleans.”

In the 1890s, The Willow had been known from the earliest days as a fine trout stream, but a St. Paul group bought a tract of land along the river below Willow Falls and established the exclusive Willow River Club, which was fenced in and controlled by members. Local, Frank Wade, challenged this because he didn’t want his fishing curtailed. After being arrested for trespassing, he eventually won his case and it became issued that “the Willow River was a public, navigable stream, and the defendant was not guilty of catching the fish in question.” This led to free use of the lakes and rivers by the public.

On April 5, 1934 the Willow got its second big flood, washing out dams upstream. The debris and floodwaters cause severe damage on Mallalieu, such as the bridge collapsing, railroad trestle and the large dam on the St. Croix. Lake Mallalieu emptied into the St. Croix River. Today, we now see the new bridge that was built as a result of this flood as well as the new dams.

Present 
During the late 1950s, Mallalieu started being recognized as an ideal and great place to live and raise a family. Prior, there had only been a few houses and cottages build on the lake. in the 1960s, large parcels started being divided into lots, and the building has continued since then until now, when essentially all the buildable sites are already in use.

Lake Mallalieu experienced a record flood in 1965 when the lake rose three to four feet over its normal level, covering parts of Riverside Drive almost 2 feet deep. In the spring of 2020 lake Mallalieu flooded again after the newly constructed Willow River dam failed to hold back flood waters following a large rainstorm. Neighbors all along Riverside Drive banded together to take out docks and boats before the flood waters could cause significant damage.

Biology 
The fish found in the lake include Panfish, Largemouth Bass, Smallmouth Bass and Northern Pike. Invasive species noticed there are Curly-leaf Pondweed, Eurasion Watermilfoil, and Rusty Crayfish.

References 

Reservoirs in Wisconsin
Lakes of St. Croix County, Wisconsin